The Global War on Terrorism Memorial Foundation is an American non-profit organization dedicated to planning, funding, and building a memorial focused on the Global War on Terrorism on the National Mall in Washington, D.C.

History 
The Global War on Terror Memorial Foundation was formed in 2015 as a 501(c)(3) nonprofit corporation by a small group of like-minded veterans, military spouses, and citizens seeking to honor the service and sacrifice of all who served in the Global War on Terrorism. In its first two years of existence, the Foundation lobbied the United States Congress to pass the Global War on Terrorism Memorial Act. The legislation, which passed the U.S. House of Representatives and U.S. Senate by unanimous consent and was signed into law by President Donald Trump on August 18th, 2017, authorized the establishment of a national war memorial on federal land in Washington, D.C. The Global War on Terrorism Memorial Act entrusts the Foundation to oversee the fundraising, design, and construction of the memorial in accordance with federal law, and exempts the Memorial from the customary 10-year statutory waiting period after the formal conclusion of the associated conflict. It also prohibits the use of federal funds for the Memorial.

From 2019 to 2021, the Foundation advocated for the passage of a piece of companion legislation, the Global War on Terrorism Memorial Location Act, which authorizes construction of a memorial specifically within the Reserve area of the National Mall. This legislation passed the House of Representatives as an amendment to the fiscal year 2022 National Defense Authorization Act on September 23, 2021. On December 15, 2021, the U.S. Senate passed the FY 2022 NDAA, thus securing congressional approval for a memorial on the National Mall. President Joe Biden signed the legislation into law on December 27, 2021.

Construction of a Memorial 

The construction of a memorial on federal land in Washington D.C. is a 24-step process as set forth by the National Capital Planning Commission. As of May 2022, the Foundation is in the midst of completing steps 9-12 of the NCPC's prescribed process, including the selection of an appropriate site for the Memorial inside the National Mall.

Leadership 

Michael "Rod" Rodriguez, a former U.S. Army Green Beret, became the President and CEO of the Foundation on January 3, 2022. President George W. Bush serves as the Foundation's Honorary Chairman. The Foundation's leadership structure also entails a Board of Directors. The Chairman of the Board is Theodore "Ted" Skokos, a retired U.S. Army officer and entrepreneur.

References

External links 

2015 establishments in Washington, D.C.
501(c)(3) organizations
Global War on Terrorism Memorial Foundation
Organizations established in 2015
War on terror